Shadow Mountain Dam is a zoned earth-fill dam on the Colorado River in Grand County, Colorado. Shadow Mountain Lake is a holding reservoir for water pumped up from Lake Granby just to the south through the Granby Pumping Plant and Canal. Shadow Mountain Lake is connected by a short channel to the natural Grand Lake. The west portal of the Alva B. Adams Tunnel is located on Grand Lake. The Adams Tunnel diverts west slope water to the east slope of the Rocky Mountains for use in agriculture and to serve the populated areas of Colorado, including Denver.

References

External links
Shadow Mountain Dam website

Dams on the Colorado River
Buildings and structures in Grand County, Colorado
United States Bureau of Reclamation dams
Dams completed in 1946
Dams in Colorado
1946 establishments in Colorado